The Two Medicine Campground Camptender's Cabin in Glacier National Park is an example of the National Park Service Rustic style. Built in 1923 and altered in 1992, when it gained electricity, it was the chief point of administrative contact in the park's Two Medicine area and served as a seasonal ranger residence.

See also
Many Glacier Campground Camptender's Cabin
Two Medicine General Store

References

Park buildings and structures on the National Register of Historic Places in Montana
Log cabins in the United States
Houses completed in 1923
National Register of Historic Places in Glacier County, Montana
Log buildings and structures on the National Register of Historic Places in Montana
1923 establishments in Montana
National Register of Historic Places in Glacier National Park